Mondol Seima District is a district (srok) of Koh Kong Province, in south-western Cambodia. The Kah Bpow River flows through it.

Administration

Notes

Districts of Koh Kong province